Jonahan Artiga "Jonah" Romero (born 17 March 1988), is an American born-Guamanian footballer who plays for SYC United in the United Premier Soccer League and the Guam national football team.

Early life and career
Jonahan was born in Fairfax, Virginia, to a Salvadoran father, Evelio Romero, and a Guamanian mother, Roxanna Artiga. Jonahan's father, who was a former professional footballer in his native El Salvador influenced him to pursue a football career. While growing up in Lorton, Virginia, he attended high school in Hayfield Secondary School where he became a wrestler for Roy Hill and a footballer for Daniel Drickey. He played two seasons for the University of Memphis, where he earned his Criminal Justice degree. He played 17 games for the Tigers coming off the bench.

Romero went on to play for Bayamon FC in Puerto Rico. After one year at Bayamon, he was transferred to Puerto Rico Islanders.
After one and a half years of playing football for the Islanders, he moved to his mother's native Guam, where he played for Cars Plus FC in the 2009-2010 season. He was also listed in the lineup for the Guam national football team. He decided to play in Trinidad and Tobago, in which he got only a 6-month contract. He later moved back to Cars Plus and continued the season. After the 2010-11 season, he was signed by Kaya FC in the United Football League. He played in the 2011 United Football Cup, in which the team finished 4th place.

In 2015 Romero signed with defending Mongolian Premier league champions Khoromkhon FC in order to play in a consistent and challenging league to prepare himself for the upcoming world cup qualifiers. He also became the first Guamanian footballer to play in Mongolia.

As of September 2022, Romero is playing for United Premier Soccer League side SYC United in his native Virginia.

Honours

Club
Kaya
United Football League: Runner-up 2011–12
PFF National Men's Club Championship : Third place 2013

Loyola
UFL Cup: 2013

Rovers FC
Guam Men's Soccer League: 2013–14
Guam FA Cup: 2014

Personal life
Romero is in a relationship with Ana Borja. The couple had a baby boy in 2015 .
He was a teacher at Holy Family Catholic School for one school year.

References

1988 births
Living people
Sportspeople from Fairfax, Virginia
American sportspeople of Salvadoran descent
Association football midfielders
Guamanian footballers
Guam international footballers
Memphis Tigers men's soccer players
Bayamón FC players
Puerto Rico Islanders players
Joe Public F.C. players
TT Pro League players
Kaya F.C. players
Khoromkhon players
Expatriate footballers in Puerto Rico
Expatriate footballers in the Philippines
Expatriate footballers in Trinidad and Tobago
Expatriate footballers in Mongolia
F.C. Meralco Manila players
People from Lorton, Virginia
United Premier Soccer League players